The 2024 United States Senate election in Indiana will be held on November 5, 2024, to elect a member of the United States Senate to represent the state of Indiana. Incumbent one-term Republican Senator Mike Braun is eligible to run for a second term in office but decided to instead run for Governor. This will be the first election for this seat with no incumbent running since 1958.

Republican primary

Candidates

Declared

Publicly expressed interest
Eric Holcomb, Governor of Indiana (2017–present) and candidate for the U.S. Senate in 2016

Potential

Declined
Mike Braun, incumbent U.S. Senator (2019–present) (running for governor)
Mitch Daniels, former Governor of Indiana (2005–2013), former President of Purdue University (2013–2022) and former Director of the Office of Management and Budget (2001–2003)

Endorsements

Polling

Democratic primary

Candidates

Potential
Joe Donnelly, U.S. Ambassador to the Holy See (2022–present) and former U.S. Senator (2013–2019)
Joe Hogsett, Mayor of Indianapolis, former Indiana Secretary of State, former U.S. Attorney for the Southern District of Indiana, and former chair of the Indiana Democratic Party

Declined
Ron Klain, former White House Chief of Staff (2021–2023)

General election

Predictions

Notes

Partisan clients

References

External links
Jim Banks (R) for Senate

2024
Indiana
United States Senate